EIM may refer to:

 EIM (video game developer)
 École internationale de Montréal, a high school in Westmount, Quebec, Canada
 Electrical impedance myography
 Engineering information management
 Enterprise information management
 European Rail Infrastructure Managers
 Exercise is Medicine, a program of the American Medical Association
 Extensor indicis muscle
 IBM Enterprise Identity Mapping